David Margoshvili (born August 11, 1980) is a Georgian judoka.

He finished in joint fifth place in the half-lightweight (66 kg) division at the 2004 Summer Olympics, having lost the bronze medal match to Yordanis Arencibia of Cuba.

Achievements

References

 Yahoo! Sports

External links
 

1980 births
Living people
Male judoka from Georgia (country)
Olympic judoka of Georgia (country)
Judoka at the 2004 Summer Olympics
21st-century people from Georgia (country)